This article displays the rosters for the participating teams at the 2006 FIBA Africa Club Championship.

Al Shabab

APR

AS Swallows

ASA

BACK

Étoile Sportive du Sahel

Kano Pillars

Lupopo

Onatra

Primeiro de Agosto

Stade Nabeulien

Union Bank

References

External links
 2006 FIBA Africa Champions Cup Participating Teams

FIBA Africa Clubs Champions Cup squads
Basketball teams in Africa
FIBA